Oud Metha is a rapid transit station on the Green Line of the Dubai Metro in Dubai, UAE, serving Al Nasr (aka Oud Metha) and Umm Hurair.

The station opened as part of the Green Line on 9 September 2011. It is close to The Indian High School, Dubai and the Dubai English Speaking School junior school site for 3–11 year olds and the Iranian Club Dubai.

See also
 Al Nasr, Dubai

References

External links
 

Railway stations in the United Arab Emirates opened in 2011
Dubai Metro stations